Stenocladius horni, is a species of firefly beetle endemic to Sri Lanka.

References 

Lampyridae
Insects of Sri Lanka
Beetles described in 1905